Bones: Original Motion Picture Houndtrack is the original soundtrack to Ernest Dickerson's 2001 horror film Bones. It was released on October 9, 2001 via Doggystyle Records and Priority Records. It peaked at #39 on the Billboard 200, #14 on the Top R&B/Hip-Hop Albums chart and #4 on the Top Soundtracks chart. The soundtrack features songs mainly by Snoop Dogg, but it also features songs by Kurupt, Xzibit, Kokane, Tha Eastsidaz, D12, LaToiya Williams, Cypress Hill and more. "Dogg Named Snoop" was the only single released from the soundtrack.

Track listing

Bones Score

Charts

Weekly charts

Personnel 

Abdul Wahab – musette bagpipes (track 7) 
Alvin Nathaniel Joiner – performer (track 12) 
André Benjamin – performer (track 19)
Andrew M. Shack – A&R (for Priority Records) 
Antwan André Patton – performer (track 19)
Brian Knapp Gardner – mastering 
Calvin Cordozar Broadus Jr. – performer (tracks: 1–2, 5, 10–11, 13, 16, 19), producer (track 1), executive producer, A&R  
Chan Gaines – performer (track 10) 
Dan Osterman – trombone (track 13) 
Dave Aron – mixing (tracks: 4–6, 8)
David Brown – performer (track 7)
David Sheats – producer (track 19)
DeShaun Dupree Holton – performer (track 9)
Domingo Padilla – producer (track 15)
Eddie Kedricks – performer (track 6)
Eric Dwayne Collins – performer (track 2)
Farid Karam Nassar – guitar (track 2), keyboards (tracks: 2, 8, 12–13), flute (track 7), percussion (tracks: 7, 13), moog synthesizer (tracks: 8, 12), scratches (track 13), mixing (tracks: 7–8, 12), producer (tracks: 1–2, 7–8, 12–13, 18), A&R
Francisco Rodriguez – producer (track 10)
Jamarr Antonio Stamps – performer (track 10)
Jeff Bass – producer (track 9)
Jerry B. Long Jr. – performer (tracks: 3, 8)
John Frye – recording (track 19)
Kareem Denis – mixing (track 15)
Keiwan Deshawn Spillman – performer (track 11)
Kevin Bell – producer (track 9)
Kevin Gilliam – producer (tracks: 3, 6, 16)
Kim Proby – performer (track 10)
Kola Marion – performer (track 11)
LaToiya Renée Williams – performer (track 4)
Lawrence Muggerud – producer, arranger & mixing (track 17)
Lorenzo Jerald Patterson – performer (track 2)
Lost Angels – performers (track 3)
Louis Freese – performer (track 17)
Maggie Magarian – art direction & design
Marshall Mathers – performer, producer & mixing (track 9)
Melvin Bradford – producer (track 5)
Mitch Rotter – A&R
Nathaniel Dwayne Hale – performer (track 16)
Ondre Moore – performer (track 9)
Priest "Soopafly" Brooks – performer (track 13), producer (track 4)
Rashaan "Cus" Stephens – mixing & recording (track 15)
Ricardo Emmanuel Brown – performer (tracks: 7, 12)
Rufus Arthur Johnson – performer (track 9)
Sean Cruse – guitar & bass (track 12)
Senen Reyes – performer (track 17)
Steve King – mixing (track 9)
The Velvet Orchestra – strings (tracks: 2, 7)
Tracey Brown – mixing (tracks: 2, 10–11, 16)
Tracy Lamar Davis – performer (tracks: 5, 11, 12)
Troy Hightower – mixing (track 19)
Vince Edwards – performer (track 6)
Warren Griffin III – producer (track 11)
William DeVaughn – performer (track 14)
Winston "F.T." Morris – performer (track 15)

References

External links

2001 soundtrack albums
Snoop Dogg albums
Gangsta rap soundtracks
Albums produced by Eminem
Albums produced by Melvin "Mel-Man" Bradford
Albums produced by DJ Muggs
Albums produced by Soopafly
Albums produced by Warren G
Albums produced by Fredwreck
Priority Records soundtracks
West Coast hip hop soundtracks
Albums produced by Domingo (producer)
Albums produced by Battlecat (producer)
Horror film soundtracks